Kholodenko or Holodenko is a gender-neutral Slavic surname that may refer to
Aron-Moyshe Kholodenko, (1828–1902) known by the stage name Pedotser, a violin virtuoso
Boris Kholodenko, Russian biologist
Vadym Kholodenko (born 1986), Ukrainian pianist
Shifra Kholodenko (1909–1974), Soviet Jewish poet

See also
 
 Cholodenko

Ukrainian-language surnames